The Literary Guild of America is a mail order book club selling low-cost editions of selected current books to its members. Established in 1927 to compete with the Book of the Month Club, it is currently owned by Bookspan. It was a way to encourage reading among the American public through curated and affordable selections.

History 
The Literary Guild was established in 1927 by Samuel W. Craig and Harold K. Guinzberg as a competitor to the Book of the Month Club, which had started in the previous year. Craig asserted that he first incorporated the company in 1922 and reincorporated it in 1926 after hearing of the success of similar book clubs in Germany. In 1929 the founders created a subsidiary operation, the Junior Library Guild, which also continues to this day.

Method of operation 
Books are selected by an editorial board. The chairman was Carl Van Doren. The chosen books are printed in special editions identified by the Literary Guild imprint on the title page. They are published on the same date as the trade editions. Charter subscribers were to receive twelve books a year at half the price of the trade editions for an annual fee of eighteen dollars.

References and sources
References

Sources

External links
 Literary Guild web site
 
 

Book clubs
Book publishing companies of the United States
Publishing companies established in 1927